Backus v. Gould, 48 U.S. (7 How.) 798 (1849), was a United States Supreme Court case in which the Court held the Copyright Act of 1831 requires courts to award damages from copyright infringement based on the number of copies found in the accused's possession, not the number of infringing copies that they ever printed. At the time, at least in the case of books, a "copy" was defined as a complete reprinting or transcription of the work.

References

External links
 

1849 in United States case law
United States copyright case law
United States Supreme Court cases
United States Supreme Court cases of the Taney Court